Mycoplasma spermatophilum  is a species of bacteria in the genus Mycoplasma. This genus of bacteria lacks a cell wall around their cell membrane. Without a cell wall, they are unaffected by many common antibiotics such as penicillin or other beta-lactam antibiotics that target cell wall synthesis. Mycoplasma are the smallest bacterial cells yet discovered, can survive without oxygen and are typically about 0. 1  µm in diameter.

This mycoplasma species was originally isolated from human spermatozoa and a human cervix. It has been rare in humans because it was recovered from only 1 to 2% of the samples examined in two surveys.  These initial samples were collected at a fertility clinic where it was noted that either eggs did not become fertilized with infected sperm or fertilized eggs did not implant in in vitro fertilization procedures. The genome of this species has been partially sequenced.

The type strain is AH159 = ATCC 49695 = CIP 105549 = NCTC 11720.

References

Bacteria described in 1991
spermatophilum